Lulom or Lulem may refer to:
 Lulom, Golestan
 Lulem, Kermanshah